F-22 Lightning 3 is a combat flight simulation game developed and published by Novalogic in 1999.

Reception

The game received above-average reviews according to the review aggregation website GameRankings.

Notes

References

External links
 Official website (archived)
 

1999 video games
Combat flight simulators
Cooperative video games
NovaLogic games
Video games developed in the United States
Windows games
Windows-only games